The Wheeling Nailers are a professional ECHL ice hockey team based in Wheeling, West Virginia. They are the ECHL affiliate of the Pittsburgh Penguins of the National Hockey League and the Wilkes-Barre/Scranton Penguins of the American Hockey League.

The Nailers are the oldest surviving minor league franchise below the level of the American Hockey League, with unbroken continuity of franchise and never having missed a season of play.

Franchise history
The Nailers began play in 1981 in the Atlantic Coast Hockey League as the Carolina Thunderbirds based in Winston-Salem, North Carolina. The Thunderbirds won four consecutive regular season titles and were three-time Bob Payne Trophy winners as league champions.  In 1987, the ACHL folded and the team joined the All-American Hockey League for the 1987–88 season. The Thunderbirds, Virginia Lancers, and Johnstown Chiefs then became the basis for the East Coast Hockey League, now known as the ECHL. The Thunderbirds lost the first ECHL playoff championship final to the Toledo Storm. The team was renamed Winston-Salem Thunderbirds in 1990 and moved to Wheeling to become the Wheeling Thunderbirds in 1992 under the leadership of president and co-owner Ed Broyhill.

After a trademark dispute with the Seattle Thunderbirds of the Western Hockey League, the team was renamed Nailers for the 1996–97 season when the franchise held a contest open to local fans, which was won by C. J. Wickham of Steubenville, Ohio. The name "Nailers" was chosen for the city's long history of nail manufacturing. For the 2012–13 season, the Nailers dropped the red-black-gold scheme they had used for nearly two decades in favor of a black-and-gold palette used by the Penguins.

The team plays at the WesBanco Arena (formerly the Wheeling Civic Center), and used the Cambria County War Memorial Arena in Johnstown, Pennsylvania as an alternative venue during the 2010–2011 and 2011-2012 seasons. After missing the playoffs for five straight seasons, they had a 106-point season in 2003–04. They were defeated by the Reading Royals in 5 games, 3–2. In season 2005–06 they had a great season making it to the second round of the playoffs losing to Toledo in the final second of the final game.

In August 2011, the Nailers moved to the Eastern Conference's Atlantic Division as part of the league realignment for the 2011–12 season. The Chicago Express took the North Division spot vacated by the Nailers. In June 2014 the Nailers returned to the North Division after the ECHL eliminated the Atlantic Division in its realignment for the 2014–15 season.

On March 29, 2012, the ECHL announced that ownership of the Nailers would be transferred from the Brooks-owned Nailers Hockey LLC to the Hockey Club of the Ohio Valley, a joint venture of the Ohio Valley Industrial & Business Development Corporation, and the Wheeling Amateur Hockey Association, to take effect at the conclusion of the 2011–2012 season.

Season-by-season results

Players and personnel

Current roster
Updated November 12, 2022.

Head coaches

Doug Sauter 1992–95
Larry Kish 1995–96
Tom McVie 1996–97
Peter Laviolette 1997–98
Chris Jensen 1998–99
Murray Eaves 1999–2000
Alain Lemieux 2000–01
Joe Harney (interim) 2001 
John Brophy 2001–03
Pat Bingham 2003–05
Glenn Patrick 2005–08
Greg Puhalski 2008–10
Stan Drulia 2010–11
Clark Donatelli 2011–15
David Gove 2015–16
Jeff Christian 2016–18
Mike Bavis 2018–2020
Mark French 2020–2021
Derek Army 2021–present

Nailers alumni

David Aebischer G – Colorado Avalanche, Montreal Canadiens, Phoenix Coyotes
Josh Archibald RW – Pittsburgh Penguins
Paul Bissonnette LW – Pittsburgh Penguins, Phoenix Coyotes
Patrick Bordeleau LW – Colorado Avalanche
Francis Bouillon D – Montreal Canadiens, Nashville Predators
Martin Brochu G – Washington Capitals, Vancouver Canucks, Pittsburgh Penguins
Daniel Carcillo LW – Phoenix Coyotes, Philadelphia Flyers, Chicago Blackhawks, New York Rangers
Andy Chiodo G – Pittsburgh Penguins
Mike Condon G – Montreal Canadiens, Pittsburgh Penguins, Ottawa Senators
Wayne Cowley G – Edmonton Oilers
John Curry G – Pittsburgh Penguins, Minnesota Wild
Scott Darling G – Chicago Blackhawks, Carolina Hurricanes 
Jeff Daw C – Colorado Avalanche
Casey DeSmith G – Pittsburgh Penguins
Drew Fata D – New York Islanders
Craig Ferguson C – Montreal Canadiens, Calgary Flames, Florida Panthers
Scott Ferguson D – Edmonton Oilers, Mighty Ducks of Anaheim, Minnesota Wild
Scott Fraser RW – Montreal Canadiens, Edmonton Oilers, New York Rangers
Joaquin Gage G – Edmonton Oilers
Alex Grant D – Anaheim Ducks
Jason Jaffray LW – Vancouver Canucks, Calgary Flames, Winnipeg Jets
Joe Jensen LW – Carolina Hurricanes
Nick Johnson LW – Pittsburgh Penguins, Minnesota Wild
David Koci LW – Chicago Blackhawks, Tampa Bay Lightning, St. Louis Blues, Colorado Avalanche
Zenon Konopka C – Mighty Ducks of Anaheim, Columbus Blue Jackets, Tampa Bay Lightning, Ottawa Senators, Minnesota Wild P
Tom Kuhnhackl RW – Pittsburgh Penguins, New York Islanders

Patrick Labrecque G – Montreal Canadiens
David Laliberte RW – Philadelphia Flyers
Peter Laviolette Head Coach – Boston Bruins, New York Islanders, Carolina Hurricanes, Philadelphia Flyers, Nashville Predators, Washington Capitals
Marc Lamothe G – Chicago Blackhawks, Detroit Red Wings
Mark Letestu C – Pittsburgh Penguins, Columbus Blue Jackets, Edmonton Oilers
Darcy Martini D – Edmonton Oilers
Marquis Mathieu C – Boston Bruins
Kurtis McLean C – New York Islanders
Mike Minard G – Edmonton Oilers
Hiroyuki Miura D – never played in the NHL, but was the first Japanese citizen drafted by the league (Montreal Canadiens, 1992)
Michel Ouellet RW – Pittsburgh Penguins, Tampa Bay Lightning, Vancouver Canucks
Cam Paddock C – St. Louis Blues
Marc Rodgers RW – Detroit Red Wings
Philip Samuelsson D – Pittsburgh Penguins, Arizona Coyotes, Montreal Canadiens
Dany Sabourin G – Pittsburgh Penguins, Vancouver Canucks, Calgary Flames
Yves Sarault LW – Montreal Canadiens, Colorado Avalanche, Ottawa Senators, Atlanta Thrashers, Nashville Predators
Zach Sill C – Pittsburgh Penguins, Toronto Maple Leafs
Ben Street C – Calgary Flames
Daniel Taylor G – Los Angeles Kings
Darcy Verot LW  – Washington Capitals
Terry Virtue D – Boston Bruins, New York Rangers
Mark Visheau D – Los Angeles Kings
Tomas Vokoun G – Nashville Predators, Florida Panthers, Washington Capitals, Pittsburgh Penguins
Tim Wallace RW – Pittsburgh Penguins

References

External links

 Official website

ECHL teams
Ice hockey teams in West Virginia
Philadelphia Flyers minor league affiliates
Pittsburgh Penguins minor league affiliates
Ice hockey clubs established in 1981
Montreal Canadiens minor league affiliates
1981 establishments in North Carolina
Sports in Wheeling, West Virginia